The Women's keirin at the 2014 UCI Track Cycling World Championships was held on 2 March 2014. 21 cyclists participated in the contest. After the 4 qualifying heats, the fastest rider in each heat advanced to the second round. The remaining riders then raced in 4 repechage heats, with the first 2 riders in each heat advancing to the second round along with the 4 that qualified before.

The first 3 riders from each of the 2 Second Round heats advanced to the Final and the remaining riders raced a consolation 7–12 final.

Medalists

Results

First round
The first round was held at 12:00.

Heat 1

Heat 2

Heat 3

Heat 4

First round repechage
The first round repechage was held at 13:15.

Heat 1

Heat 2

Heat 3

Heat 4

Second round
The second round was held at 16:10.

Heat 1

Heat 2

Finals
The Finals were held at 16:50.

Small final

Final

References

2014 UCI Track Cycling World Championships
UCI Track Cycling World Championships – Women's keirin